This is a list of events in British radio during 1990.

Events

January
3 January – Radio Clyde splits on a permanent basis with the full time launch of its classic hits service on MW. The FM station, Clyde 1, relaunched as a contemporary hit music station.
6 January – BBC Radio 2 becomes available on FM on Saturday afternoons for the first time. Previously the station's FM frequencies were loaned out at this time to BBC Radio 1 but this is no longer necessary as Radio 1 is now available on FM across much of the UK. The weekday late evening ‘borrow’ had ceased in October 1988.
8 January – 
BBC Radio 1 launches a new 30 minute news programme News 90 which replaces the teatime edition of Newsbeat.
BBC Radio 1 launches a new jingles package called ‘’Music Radio for the 90s’’.
January – Frances Line replaces Bryant Marriott as controller of BBC Radio 2.
January – Delta Radio begins broadcasting as an opt-out of County Sound for the Haslemere district on what was originally intended to be a relay transmitter for County Sound.

February
7 February – Cool FM begins broadcasting in Belfast. It replaces Downtown Radio on FM with Downtown continuing on MW. Downtown continues to be available on FM in other areas of Northern Ireland.
11 February – BBC Radio 1 starts broadcasting on FM in south west England.

March
4 March – Jazz FM, a station playing mainly soul and jazz music, launches with an Ella Fitzgerald concert at the Royal Albert Hall.
17 March – Gary King joins Radio 1, to take over the early breakfast show, initially replacing Tim Smith at weekends before moving to the weekday early show to replace Jackie Brambles, who moves to the weekday drivetime show.
25 March – At 7pm BBC Radio 2 becomes available on FM 24/7 for the first time after the final ever ’borrow’ of its FM frequencies by BBC Radio 1. 
29 March – Ahead of major changes to BBC Radio 2’s output, Brian Matthew goes Round Midnight for the final time.
31 March – 
Sounds of the 50s, presented by Ronnie Hilton, is launched and Brian Matthew takes over as host of Sounds of the 60s.
Launch of Choice FM, the first black station with a London-wide commercial licence. The station broadcasts on 96.9FM.

April
2 April – The changes to weekday programming on BBC Radio 2 begin on this date. Ken Bruce launches a new late night programme with Judith Chalmers replacing Bruce on mid-mornings, a weeknight late night jazz show called Jazz Parade is launched and a weekday guest afternoon slot is introduced featuring a different personality choosing their favourite music each week.
6 April – The first edition of The Arts Programme on BBC Radio 2 is broadcast. The programme airs on Friday, Saturday and Sunday evenings between 10pm and midnight.
April – BBC Radio 1 starts broadcasting on FM in north east England.

May
24 May – BBC Radio 1 begins FM transmission in Central Southern England. Also during 1990, the transmitters established in 1988 move to higher power.

June
1 June – Red Rose Radio, which was transmitted on 97.4 MHz and 999 kHz, is split into two stations – Red Rose Rock FM using the FM frequency and Red Rose Gold on the medium wave frequency.
22 June – Orchard FM expands its coverage southwards when a transmitter covering the southern parts of south Somerset and parts of north Dorset is switched on.
25 June – 
Spectrum Radio launches, broadcasting programmes for London's various ethnic communities. However the frequency allocated to the station was being used by pirate station Radio Caroline, thereby causing interference with Spectrum's transmissions. The Independent Broadcasting Authority, in agreement with the Department for Trade and Industry, allowed Spectrum to temporarily broadcast on 990 kHz alongside 558 kHz. Caroline eventually vacated the 558 kHz frequency and the temporary transmitter was switched off. 
The same day sees the launch of two more Incremental radio stations – Airport Information Radio, providing travel information for users of Heathrow Airport and Gatwick Airport, and Glasgow station East End Radio.  Both turn out to be short lived. Airport Information Radio closes the following year and East End Radio closes when it had its licence revoked.
28 June – The Independent Broadcasting Authority begins trials of AM Stereo on the MW transmitters of Radio Orwell. They lasted until the end of July.
29 June – Programmes For Schools are broadcast on BBC Radio 4 for the final time.

July
8 July – Wimbledon is broadcast on BBC Radio 2 for the final time. From next year, the event is broadcast on BBC Radio 5.

August
August – Atlantic 252 starts broadcasting in the evening and is now on air from 6am until 2am.
15 August – BBC Radio 2 begins to wind down its transmissions on MW ahead of the launch of BBC Radio 5 by providing a daytime information service providing advice about how to listen to Radio 2 on FM. 
20 August – The Moral Maze is broadcast for the first time on BBC Radio 4.
24 August – Listening Corner, the weekday lunchtime programme for small children, is broadcast for the final time. This marks the end of children's programming on Radio 4 until 1994.
26 August – 
Sport is broadcast on BBC Radio 2 for the final time with the final sports desk broadcast at 10.02pm.
Educational programmes are broadcast on BBC Radio 4's FM transmitters for the final time – educational programmes will return to Radio 4 in 1994 but will be broadcast only on long wave.
27 August – 
At midnight, BBC Radio 2 stops broadcasting on MW. Consequently, Radio 2 becomes the first national radio station in the UK to broadcast only on FM.
At 9am, the BBC's long-awaited fifth national radio station, BBC Radio 5 is launched on the old Radio 2 mediumwave frequencies. The station mainly carries sports, children's and educational programmes. 
Following the transfer of all of BBC radio's educational and children's programming from Radio 4's FM frequencies to Radio 5, the full BBC Radio 4 schedule is available on FM for the first time.

September
1 September – 
Kiss 100 begins broadcasting legally for the first time when it launches in London. The station had previously operated as a pirate broadcaster.
 Following the transfer of BBC Radio Sport to Radio 5, Sport on 2 is renamed Sport on 5.
30 September – Mark Goodier replaces Bruno Brookes as host of BBC Radio 1’s Top 40 show.

October
1 October – 
The Evening Session debuts on BBC Radio 1, presented by Mark Goodier.
BBC Radio 3 stays on air for an extra 30 minutes on weeknights, ending broadcasting at 12.35am. The station continues to close at midnight at the weekend.
 6 October – The Superstation closes after 2 years 3 months on air after going into liquidation.
 8 October – Severn Sound splits into two services, with Severn Sound continuing on FM with 3 Counties Radio launching on MW.
 21 October – The Network Chart is expanded to a top 40 chart and the length of the programme is extended by just under an hour, starting after the 4 pm IRN bulletin – although not all of the stations took the extra hour to begin with.

November
 5 November – The last of the IBA's Incremental Radio licenses, Sunderland station Wear FM, starts broadcasting.

December
 30 December – WABC begins broadcasting to Shropshire.

Unknown
The Piccadilly brand name returns to the FM band in Manchester when Key 103 is rebranded as Piccadilly Key 103.

Station debuts
3 January – Clyde 2
17 January – BBC CWR
22 January – Radio Borders
7 February – Cool FM
17 February – KFM
4 March – 102.2 Jazz FM
18 March – Radio Thamesmead
31 March – Choice FM
6 April – 
KCBC
Belfast Community Radio
12 April – BBC Radio Suffolk
15 April – Isle of Wight Radio
21 April – FTP
14 May – Buzz FM
21 May – South West Sound
1 June – Red Rose Gold
4 June – 
Centre Sound
CityBeat
24 June – Chiltern Supergold
25 June – 
Airport Information Radio
East End Radio
Spectrum Radio
9 July – Melody 105.4 FM
15 July –
 Max AM
Touch AM
17 July – Magic 828
27 August – BBC Radio 5
28 August – Radio Harmony
1 September – Kiss FM
7 October – Mellow 1557
October – Echo 96
5 November – Wear FM

Closing this year

Programme debuts
 March – And Now in Colour on BBC Radio 4 (1990–1991)
 3 April – Jazz Parade on BBC Radio 2 (1990–1993)
 13 May – All the World's a Globe (National Theatre of Brent) on BBC Radio 3 (1990)
 2 June – Flywheel, Shyster, and Flywheel on BBC Radio 4 (1990–1992)
 20 August – The Moral Maze on BBC Radio 4 (1990–Present)
 30 August – Formula Five on BBC Radio 5 (1990–1994)

Continuing radio programmes

1940s
 Sunday Half Hour (1940–2018)
 Desert Island Discs (1942–Present)
 Down Your Way (1946–1992)
 Letter from America (1946–2004)
 Woman's Hour (1946–Present)
 A Book at Bedtime (1949–Present)

1950s
 The Archers (1950–Present)
 The Today Programme (1957–Present)
 Sing Something Simple (1959–2001)
 Your Hundred Best Tunes (1959–2007)

1960s
 Farming Today (1960–Present)
 In Touch (1961–Present)
 The World at One (1965–Present)
 The Official Chart (1967–Present)
 Just a Minute (1967–Present)
 The Living World (1968–Present)
 The Organist Entertains (1969–2018)

1970s
 PM (1970–Present)
 Start the Week (1970–Present)
 Week Ending (1970–1998)
 You and Yours (1970–Present)
 I'm Sorry I Haven't a Clue (1972–Present)
 Good Morning Scotland (1973–Present)
 Kaleidoscope (1973–1998)
 Newsbeat (1973–Present)
 The News Huddlines (1975–2001)
 File on 4 (1977–Present)
 Money Box (1977–Present)
 The News Quiz (1977–Present)
 Breakaway (1979–1998)
 Feedback (1979–Present)
 The Food Programme (1979–Present)
 Science in Action (1979–Present)

1980s
 In Business (1983–Present)
 Sounds of the 60s (1983–Present)
 Loose Ends (1986–Present)
 Flying the Flag (1987–1992)
 Citizens (1987–1991)
 Top of the Pops (1988–1991)

Ending this year
 December – The Mary Whitehouse Experience (1989–1990)

Births
 14 February – Jordan North, DJ

Deaths
 2 April – Peter Jones, sports commentator (born 1930)
 9 October – Richard Murdoch, comic actor (born 1907)
 9 December – Andrew Timothy, Anglican priest, previously BBC announcer (born 1912)

See also
 1990 in British music
 1990 in British television
 1990 in the United Kingdom
 List of British films of 1990

References

Radio
British Radio, 1990 In
Years in British radio